The Open Door series, an adult literacy series of novellas by well-known Irish authors, was launched in the mid-1990s by Irish publisher New Island and author Patricia Scanlan. Scanlan had worked in public libraries in Dublin before becoming a full-time writer and was acutely aware of the literacy problems facing a large segment of the adult population and the dearth of appropriate reading material available to them.

The Open Door texts are subject to specific editorial guidelines, which help participating authors create novels for the purpose intended. These include: a discernible plot; a few, well-developed characters; simple language with the occasional challenging word; and short chapters, to create the feel and structure of "regular" novels. All the texts are 10,000 words or less and sentences are kept short.

These characteristics of the texts have also endeared them to students learning English as a foreign language, and they are gradually being marketed as such, with co-editions containing glossaries being produced by German ELT publisher Cornelsen as of 2006. Audio editions have also been published, by WH Howes. In summer 2007, Irish language editions of some of the most popular Open Door titles were published with the language school market in mind.

Books in the series
As of 2006, five series of the Open Doors were in print, with a new series of the English language editions planned for the autumn of 2007. One poetry anthology, edited by Niall McMonagle, was also published under the series banner. All royalties from domestic sales of English language titles are donated to a charity of the author's choice.

Books published in the first series
Sad Song - Vincent Banville 
In High Germany - Dermot Bolger 
Not Just For Christmas - Roddy Doyle 
Maggie's Story - Sheila O'Flannagan 
Billy and Jesus are Off to Barcelona - Deirdre Purcell 
Ripples - Patricia Scanlan

Books published in the second series
No Dress Rehearsal - Marian Keyes
Joe’s Wedding - Gareth O’Callaghan 
The Comedian - Joseph O’Connor 
Second Chance - Patricia Scanlan 
Pipe Dreams - Anne Schulmanl 
Old Money, New Money - Peter Sheridan

Books published in the third series
An Accident Waiting to Happen - Vincent Banville 
The Builders - Maeve Binchy 
Letter from Chicago - Cathy Kelly
Driving with Daisy - Tom Nestor 
It All Adds Up - Margaret Neylon 
Has Anyone Here Seen Larry? - Deirdre Purcell

Books published in the fourth series
Fair-Weather Friend - Patricia Scanlan 
The Story of Joe Brown - Rose Doyle 
The Smoking Room - Julie Parsons 
World Cup Diary - Niall Quinn 
The Quiz Master - Michael Scott 
Stray Dog - Gareth O'Callaghan

Books published in the fifth series
Mrs. Whippy - Cecelia Ahern 
'Mad Weekend - Roddy Doyle 
Behind Closed Doors - Sarah Webb
Secrets - Patricia Scanlan 
Not a Star - Nick Hornby 
The Underbury Witches - John Connolly

References

External links
 Open Door Series

Irish literature